The faculté des lettres de Paris was a French educational institution based at the Sorbonne. It was set up by the imperial decree regarding the University of France on 17 March 1808. It partly succeeded the arts faculty of the former University of Paris. In 1896 it was joined to four other faculties in Paris to form the new University of Paris. Following the loi Faure of 8 October 1970, it was divided into the universities Paris-I, Paris-III, Paris-IV, Paris-V and Paris-VII in 1970.

Teaching 
Its first statutes were put in place by the university's council on 16 February 1810. Each professor taught two 90-minute lessons each week. The university year began in December and lasted eight months. The faculty ran nine courses:
ancient Greek literature
Latin prose or 'éloquence latine'
Latin poetry
French prose or 'éloquence française'
French poetry
philosophy
history of philosophy
ancient and modern history
ancient and modern geography

Deans 
 Pierre-Paul Royer-Collard, philosopher
 Jean-Denis Barbié du Bocage (1815-1825), geographer
 Victor Le Clerc (1832-1865), Latinist
 Henri Patin (1865-1876), Latinist
 Henri Wallon (1876-1881), historian
 Auguste Himly (1881-1891), historian
 Ernest Lavisse (1903-...), historian
 Alfred Croiset (1845-1923), Hellenist
 Ferdinand Brunot (1919-1928),
 Henri Delacroix (1928-...), philosopher
 André Aymard, historian
 André Cholley, geographer
 Georges Davy (...-1955), philosopher
 Pierre Renouvin (1955-1958), historian
 Marcel Durry, Latinist
 Raymond Las Vergnas, scholar of the English language, final dean of the faculté (1968-1971), then first president of Université Sorbonne Nouvelle - Paris 3

References 

University of Paris
Educational institutions established in the 19th century
First French Empire
1808 establishments in France
1970 disestablishments in France